The Asia/Oceania Zone was one of the three zones of the regional Davis Cup competition in 1995.

In the Asia/Oceania Zone there were three different tiers, called groups, in which teams competed against each other to advance to the upper tier. Winners in Group I advanced to the World Group Qualifying Round, along with losing teams from the World Group first round. Teams who lost their respective ties competed in the relegation play-offs, with winning teams remaining in Group I, whereas teams who lost their play-offs were relegated to the Asia/Oceania Zone Group II in 1996.

Participating nations

Draw

 relegated to Group II in 1996.
 and  advance to World Group Qualifying Round.

First round

New Zealand vs. Chinese Taipei

South Korea vs. Indonesia

Philippines vs. Japan

India vs. Hong Kong

Second round

New Zealand vs. South Korea

India vs. Philippines

First round relegation play-offs

Indonesia vs. Chinese Taipei

Japan vs. Hong Kong

Second round relegation play-offs

Hong Kong vs. Chinese Taipei

References

External links
Davis Cup official website

Davis Cup Asia/Oceania Zone
Asia Oceania Zone Group I